PDCA is plan–do–check–act or plan-do-check-adjust, an iterative four-step management method.

PDCA may also refer to:

 Painting and Decorating Contractors of America
 Muramoylpentapeptide carboxypeptidase, an enzyme
 Patiala District Carrom Association, affiliated to Punjab State Carrom Association